The 1989 NCAA Division I-AA football rankings are from the NCAA Division I-AA football committee. This is for the 1989 season.

Legend

NCAA Division I-AA Football Committee poll

Notes

References

Rankings
NCAA Division I FCS football rankings